Psygmatocerus is a genus of beetles in the family Cerambycidae, containing the following species:

 Psygmatocerus guianensis Tavakilian & Monné, 2002
 Psygmatocerus pubescens Bruch, 1926
 Psygmatocerus wagleri Perty, 1828

References

Torneutini